Kola Kheyl (also Romanized as Kolā Kheyl) is a village in Tangeh Soleyman Rural District, Kolijan Rostaq District, Sari County, Mazandaran Province, Iran. At the 2006 census, its population was 67, in 23 families.

References 

Populated places in Sari County